Justin L. Fawson is an American politician and a Republican member of the Utah House of Representatives representing District 7 since April 23, 2014.

Early life and career 
Born June 16, Fawson enlisted in the Utah National Guard after serving a two-year LDS mission to Milan, Italy. He served nine years, attaining the rank of Staff Sergeant before being honorably discharged in 2005. During his time in the National Guard, Fawson studied at the Defense Language Institute earning a Certificate of Linguistics in Arabic. He earned a BA degree in International Business from Westminster College in 2004 and a MBA specializing in Global Operations/Supply Chain Management from Cappella University in 2013. He currently works as Director of Marketing for Mountain Alarm, a security and fire protection provider. He lives in North Ogden, UT with his wife, Sara and four children.

Political career 
2014 Fawson was appointed to fill the seat vacated by Ryan Wilcox, who resigned to become the Northern Utah Director. He then ran in the 2014 General Election against Democrat Camille Neider and Libertarian Roger Condie. Fawson won with 4,392 votes (65.01%).

2015 During the 2015 General Session, Fawson served on the Public Education Appropriations Subcommittee, the House Education Committee, the House Transportation Committee, the Transportation Interim Committee, and the Education Interim Committee.

2016 During the 2016 General Session, Fawson served on the Public Education Appropriations Subcommittee, the House Education Committee, and the House Transportation Committee.

2017 During the 2017 General Session, Fawson served on the Public Education Appropriations Subcommittee, the House Education Committee, the House Rules Committee, the House Transportation Committee, the Education Interim Committee, and the Transportation Interim Committee.

2018 During the 2018 General Session, Fawson was selected to be the Vice-Chair of the House Government Operations Committee. In addition to that, he served on the Public Education Appropriations Subcommittee, the House Education Committee, the House Rules Committee, the Education Interim Committee, and the House Transportation Committee.

2015 Sponsored Legislation 

Fawson passed both of the two bills he introduced during the 2015 General Session, giving him a 100% passage rate. He also floor sponsored SB0133S04 Podiatric Physician Amendments and SB0149 Repeal of Funds.

2016 Sponsored Legislation 

Fawson passed four of the six bills he introduced during the 2016 General Session, giving him a 66.7% passage rate. He also floor sponsored SB0058S04 Nurse Practitioner Amendments.

2017 Sponsored Legislation 

Fawson passed six of the eight bills he introduced during the 2017 General Session, giving him a 75% passage rate. He also floor sponsored SB0150S02 Local Government Bond Amendments and SB0186 Education Reporting Amendments.

References

External links 
 Official page at the Utah State Legislature
 Justin Fawson at Ballotpedia
 J ustin Fawson at OpenSecrets

Place of birth missing (living people)
Year of birth missing (living people)
Living people
Mayors of places in Utah
Republican Party members of the Utah House of Representatives
People from North Ogden, Utah
Utah State University alumni
21st-century American politicians